The American Computer & Robotics Museum (ACRM), formerly known as the American Computer Museum, is a museum of the history of computing, communications, artificial intelligence and robotics that is located in Bozeman, Montana, United States.

The museum's mission is "... to explore the past and imagine the future of the Information Age through thought-provoking exhibits, innovative storytelling, and the bold exchange of ideas."

History of the museum
The American Computer & Robotics Museum was founded by George and Barbara Keremedjiev as a non-profit organization in May 1990 in Bozeman, Montana. It is likely the oldest extant museum dedicated to the history of computers in the world. The museum's artifacts trace over 4,000 years of computing history and information technology. George Keremedjiev passed away in November 2018, but his wife Barbara, the Museum Board, and the museum's Executive Director continue working toward his goals to "collect, preserve, interpret, and display the artifacts and history of the information age."

Exhibits on display
The museum has several permanent exhibits on display. The Benchmarks of the Information Age provides an overview of information technology from roughly 1860 B.C.E. with the development of ancient writing systems up to 1976 C.E. with the Apple I personal computer. Another significant exhibit is the NASA Apollo program, including NASA artifacts on loan from the National Air and Space Museum, such as an Apollo Guidance Computer and a watch worn on the Moon by Apollo 15 Commander David Scott, as well as the last surviving mainframe from the Apollo 11 mission, a UNIVAC 418-II. Another exhibit includes a comprehensive collection of early personal computers like the Altair 8800, IMSAI 8080, Commodore PET, Sol-20, Apple II, Apple III, Apple Lisa, Apple Mac, KIM-1, and SYM-1. The museum has several more exhibits detailing Enigma codebreaking during World War II, neural computing and artificial intelligence, office and communications technology, robotics and automation with Hollywood artifacts, video games, and the future of computing with an eye toward quantum computing. The museum's current special exhibit is the Vintage Mac Museum, a private collection recently donated to the ACRM by the family of collector Adam Rosen.

Awards

In 1994 the American Computer Museum won the Dibner Award for Excellence in Museum Exhibits from the  Society for the History of Technology.

Beginning in 1997, The American Computer Museum has presented the Stibitz-Wilson awards with support from Montana State University. The  George R. Stibitz Computer & Communications Innovator Award is named for Dr. George R. Stibitz, who first built the first binary adding unit in 1937. The Edward O. Wilson Biodiversity Technology Innovator Award is named for Harvard Emeritus Professor Dr. Edward O. Wilson. In 2011, the museum formalized a new category of award called Lifetime Achievement.

Stibitz Award winners 

 1997 – Arthur Burks, Chuan Chu, Jack Kilby, Jerry Merryman, James Van Tassel, Maury Irvine, Eldon Hall, Ted Hoff, Federico Faggin
 1998 – Ed Roberts, Doug Engelbart
 1999 – James Harris, Vinton G. Cerf, Robert E. Kahn
 2000 – Steve Wozniak, Tim Berners-Lee, Ray Tomlinson
 2001 – Ted Hoff, Federico Faggin and Stan Mazor (together)
 2002 – Ralph Baer, Martin Cooper, Leroy Hood, Klein Gilhousen, James Russell, Jon Titus
 2005 – Ross Perot, Paul Baran, John Blankenbaker
 2006 – Edward O. Wilson
 2010 – Barbara Liskov, Max Mathews, Steve Sasson
 2012 – Robert Metcalfe, Vic Hayes
 2013 – Walt Disney (posthumously awarded), Chuck Hull, John Henry Holland, Jean B. Sweeney
 2014 – Eric Horvitz, Douglas Hofstadter, Hans Moravec, Edward Feigenbaum, David Andes, Cynthia Breazeal
 2015 – David Ferrucci, Robert Gunderson
 2016 – Alan Turing (posthumously awarded), Joseph Desch, Mary Shaw
 2017 – Jennifer Doudna, Michelle Simmons, Mark Ritter, Rufus Cone, Jerry M. Chow, Jay Gambetta
 2018 – Donna Dubinsky, Bonnie J. Dunbar

Wilson Award winners 

 2009 – Ignacio Rodriguez-Iturbe, Steve Running, Michael Soulé, David Ward
 2010 – Sir Alec Jeffreys, Lynn Margulis, David Quammen
 2011 – Jim Lotimer, John Kress, Peter Belhumeur, David Jacobs
 2012 – Paul Anastas, May Berenbaum, Gary Strobel
 2013 – Frans de Waal, 
 2014 – Rebecca D. Costa, Dorothy Hinshaw Patent, Cathy Whitlock, John Charles Priscu
 2015 – Janine Benyus, Kjetil Våge, Laurie Marker
 2016 – Dan Wenk
 2017 – Jennifer Doudna, John Heminway
 2018 – Diana Six, Andone C. Lavery, Bonnie J. Dunbar

Lifetime Achievement Award Winners

 2011 – Federico Faggin
 2017 – Jonathan Titus

Stibitz-Wilson Awards
 2022 - Paula Apsell, J. Craig Venter, Steve Wozniak

Collection

The ACRM's collection contains a wide variety of objects that span over 4,000 years of information technology history, beginning with a Babylonian cuneiform tablet dated to between 1860 and 1837 B.C.E. and a replica of the Antikythera Mechanism, the earliest known geared mechanism, circa 80 B.C.E. The Antikythera Mechanism is an ancient Greek analog computer and orrery used to predict astronomical positions and eclipses for calendar and astrological purposes. 

The ACRM has a large collection of historical books, documents, and artifacts related to the history of computing, communications, and knowledge dating back to 1605, including original manuscripts by Francis Bacon and Rene Descartes and original copies of Newton's Principia & Opticks and Locke's Essay Concerning Human Understanding. 

The museum also has a vast collection of early office technologies including mechanical adding machines like the Arithmometer, electromechanical/electronic calculators (Friden, SCM, Monroe, Mathatron, Anita, Cal Tech (calculator), and Wang), telephones, telegraphs, typewriters, cash registers, and several telephone switchboards. It also holds an IBM 409 (relay-based tabulator) and a IBM 604 (vacuum tube calculator), mechanical adding machines, and a variety of slide rules.

The museum also has military technology, including a Minuteman 1 Missile Guidance Computer and a Norden bombsight. 

The museum's collection also includes mechanical, electrical, and electronic toys, an industrial robot, and early consumer robots like Hubot. 

Additionally, the museum has a replica of the Model K, the first binary adder, built for the museum by its inventor, George R. Stibitz. Also, the ACRM holds many mainframe computers and associated hardware from the 1950s to 1990s including the IBM 1620 Model II, the IBM System/360 Model 20, the Burroughs 205, PDP-8, PDP-8/ and the UNIVAC 1004.

Signed artifacts at the ACRM include an original Altair 8800 signed by Ed Roberts and an original Apple I signed and donated by Steve Wozniak. The museum also has an original January 1975 Popular Electronics Magazine announcing the Altair signed by Ed Roberts, Bill Gates, Paul Allen and Monte Davidoff.

See also
Computer museum

References

External links
American Computer & Robotics Museum website

Museums established in 1990
Computer museums in the United States
History museums in Montana
Museums in Bozeman, Montana
1990 establishments in Montana
Science museums in Montana